Trachylepis homalocephala, commonly known as the red-sided skink, is a small, slender species of skink in the subfamily Mabuyinae.

Geographic range and habitat
T. homalocephala is indigenous to Southern Africa, where it typically occurs in coastal thicket and leaf litter along the South African coast - from Cape Town, eastwards along the coast as far as Mozambique. A few tiny isolated populations also occur in moist mountainous areas further inland.

Description
This small, elegant skink has a shiny, brightly striped body. Males change colour in the breeding season, developing bright red stripes on their flanks.

Reproduction
The adult female red-sided skink lays around 6 eggs in summer.

Taxonomy
T. homalocephala was first described in 1828 by Wiegmann (who named it Scincus homolocephalus), based on specimens at the Natural History Museum in Berlin that were collected in South Africa by Ludwig Krebs.

In captivity
Red-sided skinks are popular in the pet trade.

References

Further reading
Boulenger GA (1887). Catalogue of the Lizards in the British Museum (Natural History). Second Edition. Volume III. ... Scincidæ ... London: Trustees of the British Museum (Natural History). (Taylor and Francis, printers). xii + 575 pp. + Plates I-XL. (Mabuia homalocephala, pp. 170–171).
Branch, Bill (2004). Field Guide to Snakes and other Reptiles of Southern Africa. Third Revised edition, Second impression. Sanibel Island, Florida: Ralph Curtis Books. 399 pp. . (Mabuya homalocephala, p. 153 + Plate 52).
Wiegmann AF (1828). "Beyträge zur Amphibienkunde ". Isis von Oken 21 (4): 364-383. (Scincus homolocephalus, new species, p. 374). (in German and Latin).

Trachylepis
Skinks of Africa
Reptiles of South Africa
Reptiles described in 1828
Taxa named by Arend Friedrich August Wiegmann